The Auckland Open  is an annual darts tournament on the WDF circuit that began in 2006.

List of tournaments

2016 tournament

The 2016 Auckland Open took place in Auckland on 17 September 2016.

Results
Here are the results:

Tournament records men
 Most wins 3:  Cody Harris. 
 Most Finals 3:  Cody Harris.
 Most Semi-finals 4:  Cody Harris,  Craig Caldwell. 
 Most Quarter-finals 4:  Cody Harris,  Craig Caldwell. 
 Most Appearances 5:  Cody Harris. 
 Most Prize Money won NZS$ ,: 
 Best winning average (.) :  .
 Youngest Winner age 32:   Craig Caldwell.
 Oldest Winner age 32:  Craig Caldwell.

See also
List of BDO ranked tournaments
List of WDF tournaments

References

External links
New Zealand Darts Council

2006 establishments in New Zealand
Darts tournaments
Darts in New Zealand